Marie Oyon (31 December 1898 – 11 October 1969) was a French politician. She was elected to the National Assembly in October 1945 as one of the first group of French women in parliament. She served in the National Assembly until June the following year, and then a member of the Council of the Republic until 1948.

Biography
Oyon was born in Montoir-de-Bretagne in 1898. Orphaned at a young age, she trained to be a shorthand typist. She moved to Sarthe to find work, where she met Alexandre Oyon, an insurer from Le Mans. The couple married and had two children. Alexandre became deputy mayor of the city in 1935, while Oyon set up a secular home school in the working class Abattoirs-Batignoles district. During the Nazi occupation, the couple participated in the French resistance. They were arrested by the gestapo in 1944. Initially imprisoned in Archives and the Fort de Romainville, Marie was later sent to Ravensbrück concentration camp in Germany, while Alexandre was sent to Amsterdam, where he died.

After the war, Oyon returned to France and was elected to the General Council of Le Mans. She was subsequently a French Section of the Workers' International (SFIO) candidate in Sarthe department in the October 1945 National Assembly elections and was elected to parliament, becoming one of the first group of women in the National Assembly. Although she lost her seat in the June 1946 elections, in December 1946 she was elected to the Council of the Republic by members of the National Assembly. Still suffering from  her time in Ravensbrück, she did not stand for re-election in 1948. She died in Le Mans in 1969.

References

1898 births
Ravensbrück concentration camp survivors
French Section of the Workers' International politicians
Women members of the National Assembly (France)
French senators elected by the National Assembly
1969 deaths
20th-century French women politicians
Women members of the Senate (France)